Sociedade de Desenvolvimento Mineiro (SDM) is an Angolan public mining company and holds the mining rights in an area of concession of 2,950 km2, located in the hydrological basin of Cuango River, Lunda Norte Province.

As joint venture, its board of shareholders includes the following companies: Endiama (National Diamond Company of Angola), an Angolan public company and OMSI (Odebrecht Mining Services Inc), a Brazilian private company.

It prospects, develops, mines and trades diamonds from primary and secondary deposits, identified in the region of Cuango River, in the north-eastern region of Angola that produces good quality stones. Bulk sampling of river terrace gravels in the vicinity of the Ganzo, Tázua and Ginge river diversions have revealed economic diamond grades.

The corporation generates positive cash flow from its tailings operations, and it now plans to use portions of those cash flows to fund an exploration project on properties adjacent to its current facilities for which it holds the ownership and surface rights. 

SDM is one of the world’s leading diamond producers by value and has played a role in the transformation of Angola’s economy and business development. The project had a US$ 83,726,933 profit in 2001 and has approximately 2000 employees. Its president is Mr. Telirio Pinto Jr.

References 

Mining companies of Angola
Diamond mining companies